Renaissance are an English progressive rock band, best known for their 1978 UK top 10 hit "Northern Lights" and progressive rock classics like "Carpet of the Sun", "Mother Russia", and "Ashes Are Burning". They developed a unique sound, combining a female lead vocal with a fusion of classical, folk, rock, and jazz influences. Characteristic elements of the Renaissance sound are Annie Haslam's wide vocal range, prominent piano accompaniment, orchestral arrangements, vocal harmonies, acoustic guitar, bass guitar, synthesiser, and versatile drum work. The band created a significant following in the northeast United States in the 1970s, and that region remains their strongest fan base.

The original line-up included two former members of the Yardbirds, Keith Relf and Jim McCarty, along with John Hawken, Louis Cennamo and Relf's sister Jane Relf. They intended to put "something together with more of a classical influence". Renaissance was born, and the band released a studio album in 1969, and another in 1971. Subsequently, John Tout replaced Hawken on keyboards, followed by a period of high turnover of musicians until the "classic line-up" of Annie Haslam, John Tout, Michael Dunford, Jon Camp, and Terry Sullivan was established, although none of them were in the original band. They were assisted with lyrics on many songs from Cornish poet Betty Thatcher-Newsinger. From 1972 to 1979 Renaissance released seven successful studio albums, toured extensively, and sold out three nights in a row at Carnegie Hall with Tony Cox conducting the New York Philharmonic.

The 1980s were a lean time for them, with personnel changes, and two relatively unsuccessful studio albums, leading to disbandment in 1987. Two different offshoots of Renaissance existed at the same time at one period in the mid-1990s. The band re-formed in 1998 to record Tuscany, which was eventually released in 2001; however, they disbanded again the next year.

2009 heralded a new line-up for Renaissance, led by Haslam and Dunford, and since then the band has continued to record and tour. Dunford died in November 2012. Later, Haslam stated that the band would continue touring. The line-up during the 2010's tended to not be as "English" as during the band's early period, with five U.S.-born members and one England-born member residing in the United States. In 2013, Renaissance released the studio album Grandine il Vento, re-released the following year under the title Symphony of Light.

Original incarnation (1969–1970)
As the Yardbirds were transforming into the New Yardbirds (with Jimmy Page) in 1968 and then Led Zeppelin, the departing founding members of the Yardbirds, Keith Relf and Jim McCarty, formed an acoustic duo called Together.
 They released "Henry's Coming Home" b/w "Love Mum and Dad" as a single on Columbia Records in November 1968 without chart success.

In January 1969, Relf and McCarty organized a new group devoted to experimentation with rock, folk, and classical forms. In his book Mountains Come Out of the Sky: An Illustrated History of Prog Rock, Will Romano quoted McCarty: "Toward the end of the Yardbirds we wanted to do something a bit more poetic, if you like, not so heavy. A bit more folky... We had had enough of heavy rock." This quintet—Relf on guitar and vocals, McCarty on drums and vocals, plus bassist Louis Cennamo, pianist John Hawken, and Relf's sister Jane as an additional vocalist—released a pair of albums on Elektra (US) and Island (UK-ILPS 9114), the first one, titled simply Renaissance (1969), being produced by fellow ex-Yardbird Paul Samwell-Smith.

The band had begun performing in May 1969, before recording had commenced for the debut LP, mostly in the UK, but with occasional forays abroad, including festivals in Belgium (Amougies, October 1969) and France (Operation 666 at the Olympia in January 1970, and Le Bourget in March 1970, both in Paris). In February 1970, they embarked on a North American tour, but that month-long trek proved only marginally successful. Because of their Yardbirds credentials, they found themselves paired with bands such as the Kinks and their new classically orientated direction did not always go down well because audiences were expecting rock/blues-based material.

Beginning in the late spring of 1970 as touring began to grind on them, the original band gradually dissolved. Keith Relf and McCarty decided to quit performing, and Cennamo joined Colosseum. Hawken organized a new line-up to fulfill contractual obligations to Island Records and complete the band's second album, Illusion (1971) which had been left unfinished.

Transition (1970–71)
Apart from Jane Relf, the new band consisted mostly of former members of Hawken's previous band, the Nashville Teens – guitarist Michael Dunford, bassist Neil Korner and singer Terry Crowe, plus drummer Terry Slade. This line-up recorded one track, "Mr Pine", a Dunford composition, and played a few gigs during the summer of 1970. Meanwhile, a final recording session brought together the original line-up minus Hawken, with Don Shin sitting in on keyboards, and produced the album's closing track "Past Orbits of Dust". The now completed Illusion was released in Germany in 1971, although it was not released in the UK until 1976 (Island HELP 27). The album marked the beginning of Renaissance's long-standing collaboration with poet Betty Thatcher-Newsinger as lyricist when she co-wrote two songs with Relf and McCarty.

The two remaining original members left in late 1970; Jane Relf was replaced by American folk singer Anne-Marie "Binky" Cullom, then John Hawken left to join Spooky Tooth and pianist John Tout replaced him. There is an extant video (released on the DVD "Kings & Queens" in 2010) of that line-up performing five songs on a German TV program (Muzik-Kanal). The plan at the time was that Relf and McCarty would remain involved as non-performing members – Relf as a producer and McCarty as a songwriter. Both were present when singer Annie Haslam successfully auditioned in January 1971 to replace the departing Cullom (who would later marry drummer Terry Slade and retire from the music scene). While McCarty would go on to write songs for the new band, Relf's involvement would be short-lived. Dunford soon emerged as a prolific composer, and continued the writing partnership with Thatcher, who would go on to write most of the lyrics for the band's 1970s albums.

Second incarnation (1971–1980)
Sometime in 1971, new manager Miles Copeland III decided to re-organize the band, focusing on what he felt were Renaissance's strong points – Haslam's voice and Tout's piano. Will Romano in Mountains Come Out of the Sky explained that "unlike many of the artists to which they were compared Renaissance allowed the piano and female voice to come to the forefront". Until then Haslam had shared vocals with Terry Crowe, who was in effect the band's chief vocalist. Crowe and Korner went, the former not replaced, the latter replaced by a succession of bass players, including John Wetton (later of King Crimson, U.K., and Asia), Frank Farrell (formerly of Supertramp) and Danny McCulloch (formerly of the Animals and a former bandmate of Dunford and Crowe in the Plebs), until the position settled with the inclusion of Jon Camp. It was also decided that Dunford would now concentrate on composing, and a new guitar player, Mick Parsons, was brought in for live work. In 1972, shortly before recording sessions for the new band's debut LP, drummer Terence Sullivan joined after Slade's initial replacement, Ginger Dixon, was deemed unsuitable following a European tour. Parsons died in a car accident and was replaced at short notice by Rob Hendry. The resulting line-up entered the studio having played only a dozen gigs together.

Prologue was released later in 1972 on EMI-Sovereign Records in the UK and on Capitol-Sovereign in North America. Prologue'''s music was, except for two songs by McCarty, composed by Dunford, with all lyrics by Thatcher-Newsinger. Rock radio stations (particularly in the northeast US and Cleveland) gave the song "Spare Some Love" significant airplay for a few months after the album's release, and fans of Yes and Emerson, Lake & Palmer in particular, took notice of the band. Francis Monkman, of the group Curved Air (another group managed by Copeland), was a guest on VCS3 synthesizer on the final track "Rajah Khan".

Hendry was replaced for the Prologue tour by Peter Finberg, but Finberg was already committed to another band and so could not be a permanent replacement. This left Camp to play most of the guitar on their next album, Ashes are Burning, released in 1973. Though the band were trying to transition to a more acoustic sound, Andy Powell, of the group Wishbone Ash (yet another group managed by Copeland), was brought in for an electric guitar solo on the final track "Ashes are Burning", which became the band's anthem piece, often extended in live performances to over twenty minutes with a long bass solo and other instrumental workouts. The album became the band's first to chart in the US, where it reached No. 171 on the Billboard 200. Shortly after the album's release, Michael Dunford returned as (acoustic) guitarist, completing what most fans regard as the classic five-piece line-up, which would remain together through five studio albums. The band played their first US concerts during this period, enjoying success on the East Coast in particular, which soon resulted in a special orchestral concert at New York's Academy of Music in May 1974. Soon Renaissance would choose to concentrate on the US market, as the UK press virtually ignored them.

Joining BTM label
The band left Sovereign Records and joined Miles Copeland's new prog rock stable and label BTM (for British Talent Management). The label's first release was Turn of the Cards in 1974. With a larger budget, the album went from folk-flavoured to a more dark, lush, orchestral rock sound. One of the album's songs, "Things I Don't Understand", which clocked in at 9:30, was Jim McCarty's last co-writing credit with the group (although it was actually in the band's live repertoire for years). A lengthy tribute to Aleksandr Solzhenitsyn, called "Mother Russia", closed out the album, with lyrics inspired by his autobiographical novel, One Day in the Life of Ivan Denisovich. Turn of the Cards was first issued in the United States on Sire Records in August 1974, where it reached No. 94, some months before an official UK release. It remained in the Billboard 200 for 21 weeks. Although Renaissance's fan base was relatively small, its following was heavily concentrated in the large cities of the northeast US. The album was eventually released in the UK in March 1975.

It was soon followed by Scheherazade and Other Stories, released on both sides of the Atlantic in September 1975. The album, whose second side was taken up with the epic tone-poem "Song of Scheherazade" based on stories from One Thousand and One Nights, peaked at No. 48 in the United States. There is "no musical connection to the well-known classical work Scheherazade by Nikolai Rimsky-Korsakov", but the track does have a recurring six-note motif that alludes to that work.

A double live album, Live at Carnegie Hall, followed in 1976. Despite criticisms that much of the album was little more than a note for note reproduction of highlights from their previous four studio albums, the album reached No. 55 in the US. Renaissance were the first British band to sell out three consecutive nights at Carnegie Hall. They were joined on stage by the New York Philharmonic Orchestra. While introducing the song "Ashes Are Burning", Haslam refers to it as the title track from the group's second album, rather than their fourth, suggesting that the Haslam-led lineup by this point considered themselves a distinct band from Keith Relf's incarnation of the group. (This point is further underscored by the band's including an album discography in the gatefold of LP copies of Live at Carnegie Hall, which lists only the four albums from Prologue forward.)Live at Carnegie Halls follow-up, Novella, saw more chart success in the US, peaking at No. 46 in 1977, although its UK release was delayed by yet another label change. Will Romano in Mountains Come Out of the Sky describes the band: "Renaissance was at an all-time popularity high, finding themselves playing to sold-out audiences ... in the U.S., particularly in the northeastern part of the country, in Pennsylvania and New York."

UK hit single
Although commercial success was limited during this period, Renaissance scored a hit single in Britain with "Northern Lights", which reached No. 10 during the summer of 1978. The single was taken from the album A Song for All Seasons (a No. 58 album in the US), and received significant airplay in the US on both AOR and on radio stations adapting to a new format known as "soft rock", now known as adult contemporary. The band performed on a modestly successful tour of the US east of the Mississippi and drew significant crowds in State College, Pennsylvania and Cleveland in May and June 1979, promoting both A Song for All Seasons and a mix of old and new tracks. Additionally, the band gained exposure via US television; performing "Carpet of the Sun" in 1977 on The Midnight Special, and appearing as guests on the May 4, 1978, edition of the Mike Douglas Show, where they played "Northern Lights".

Renaissance floundered following 1979's Azure d'Or, as many fans could not relate to a largely synthesizer-oriented sound. As a result, the band's fan base began to lose interest and the album only reached No. 125. Dunford and Camp assumed most of the band's songwriting.

In the 1970s, Renaissance defined their work with folk rock and classical fusions. Their songs include quotations from and allusions to such composers as Alain, Bach, Chopin, Debussy, Giazotto, Maurice Jarre, Rachmaninoff, Rimsky-Korsakov, Prokofiev and Shostakovich. Renaissance records, especially Ashes Are Burning, were frequently played on American progressive rock radio stations such as WNEW-FM, WHFS-FM, WMMR-FM, KSHE 95 and WVBR.

Critical reception to the "classic line-up"
Reviewers were deeply divided in their reactions to the "classic" period of Renaissance, and their style of music. Some critics saw little value in their music, like Wayne King's entry in The New Rolling Stone Record Guide describing the period 1974 to 1983: "Their inability to compose songs that would allow for any fluidity or improvisation meant that Renaissance's appeal, nonexistent in their native England and cultish at best in America, declined ... and the remainder of the Sire material matches this commercial decline with an artistic one. The comeback attempt on IRS ... was a ludicrous failure."
Progressive rock reviewers were much more supportive, such as Charles Snider in The Strawberry Bricks Guide to Progressive Rock evaluating the album Scheherazade and Other Stories, who describes:

"Annie Haslam's crystal clear five-octave voice high in the mix, supported by the virtuoso talents of pianist John Tout and Jon Camp's distinctive Rickenbacker bass, and orchestral arrangements by Tony Cox."

1980–1998
After the Azure d'Or tour, Tout left the group for personal reasons, quickly followed by Sullivan. Subsequent albums Camera Camera (1981) and Time-Line (1983) brought Renaissance more into the contemporary synthpop and new wave genre, but neither garnered enough commercial interest to make a viable future for the band. Camera Camera was the band's final album to chart in the US where it reached No. 196 in late 1981. In 1985 Camp left, and Haslam and Dunford led an acoustic version of the band and performed occasional shows (the last being in Georgetown, DC, until splitting up in August 1987).

In 1988, Sire issued a two-part compilation, Tales of 1001 Nights, focusing on the band's 1972–79 period. In the 1990s most of their catalogue appeared on CD from reissue record labels such as Repertoire Records (Germany). In 2006 Repertoire issued remastered versions of Ashes are Burning, Turn of the Cards and Scheherezade and Other Stories.

In the mid-1990s, both Haslam (who had released a self-titled solo album in 1989) and Dunford (who had been working on a proposed musical based on the Scheherazade storyline) formed their own bands, each using the name Renaissance and releasing albums with different line-ups.

Third incarnation
Renaissance partially re-formed in 1998 around a nucleus of Haslam, Dunford and Sullivan, plus Tout and several new musicians, most notably Roy Wood and Mickey Simmonds, to record the CD Tuscany. In 1999, Haslam, Dunford and Simmonds played a one-off trio concert at London's Astoria supporting Caravan.

In March 2001, following the delayed release of Tuscany, a full band tour was organised, with a line-up of Haslam, Dunford, Sullivan, Simmonds, Rave Tesar (keyboards) and David J. Keyes (bass/voc), who played one London concert on 9 March (again at the Astoria) and three dates in Japan – Osaka on the 13th, Nagoya on the 14th and Tokyo on the 16th. The Tokyo concert was recorded and released as In the Land of the Rising Sun: Live in Japan 2001. (Tout, although in the audience at the Astoria, did not perform on this tour.) Haslam, who had become the band's spokesperson, said that several factors made further touring and recording impractical. The band's short third incarnation was soon over.

Terry Sullivan recorded an album called South of Winter in 2004, with a studio group he named Renaissant. It is evocative of Renaissance's music, with lyrics by Thatcher-Newsinger and keyboard contributions by John Tout.

On 20 September 2008, John Tout made his first public appearance in the US in over 25 years, with Annie Haslam and the Jann Klose band, at the Sellersville Theatre 1894 in Sellersville, Pennsylvania. In 2009, Tout suffered a heart attack.

In August 2009, Haslam announced that she and Dunford were commemorating the 40th anniversary of Renaissance with a re-formed band, called Renaissance 2009 (including no other members of the "classic" line-up, but with musicians from the 2001 incarnation of the band), and a concert tour.

A tour in Eastern North America and Japan was undertaken in 2010, together with a three-song EP release and a new official website. Renaissance headlined the sold-out final edition of the North East Art Rock Festival, entitled NEARfest Apocalypse, on 23 June 2012.

Bassist/vocalist David J. Keyes died in July 2019 from leiomyosarcoma.

Deaths of Betty Thatcher, Michael Dunford, and John Tout
Betty Thatcher (born 16 February 1944), the band's non-performing lyricist who wrote most of the lyrics for the band (mostly for the second 'classic' lineup, but starting with the original Relf-led version), died on 15 August 2011.

On 20 November 2012, Michael Dunford (born 8 July 1944) died from a cerebral hemorrhage at his home in Surrey, England. A few weeks later, Haslam stated that the band would continue touring in the future, despite losing "her guiding light". In February 2013, it was announced that Ryche Chlanda would be the guitarist on their 2013 tour, and he has established a permanent role in the band, although not appearing on their 2015 UK and European dates.

John Tout died of lung failure on 1 May 2015 at the Royal Free Hospital in Hampstead, London. According to ultimateclassicrock.com, the band paid tribute to their former keyboardist on their Facebook page, saying: “He was an amazing musician, highly contributing to the unique sound of the band from 1970–1980."

Symphony of Light
In April 2013 a new Renaissance album, Grandine il Vento, was released. It was dedicated on the inside sleeve to Dunford. This album was reissued as Symphony of Light in April 2014 with three bonus tracks.

Symphony of Light follows a similar path to the band's early work with a combination of shorter songs, and longer, more progressive tracks such as the title track, and "The Mystic and the Muse". The band were joined by well-known guest musicians Ian Anderson playing the flute on "Cry to the World", and John Wetton performing a duet with Haslam on "Blood Silver Like Moonlight". All the music was written by Dunford, except "Renaissance Man" (dedicated to Dunford) which was written by Rave Tesar. All the lyrics were written by Haslam, and the artwork featured a painting 'Symphony of Light' also by Haslam.

Ralph Greco, Jr. in vintagerock.com observed that "Symphony of Light thrives on lush production, evocative lyrics, excellent playing and that superlative voice that could only belong to Annie Haslam."

The current line-up is not as English as the band's early period with five U.S. born members, and one English born member who lives in the U.S.

PersonnelCurrent members' Annie Haslam – vocals, percussion (1971–1987, 1998–2002, 2009–present)
 Rave Tesar – keyboards, piano (2001–2002, 2009–present)
 Mark Lambert – guitar, backing vocals (2015–present); bass (1985–1987)
 Frank Pagano – drums, percussion, backing vocals (2009–2017, 2018–present)
 Leo Traversa – bass, backing vocals (2015–2018, 2022–present) 
 Geoffrey Langley – keyboards, backing vocals (2016–present)

Discography

Studio albums

Live albums

Other releases
 In the Beginning (compilation double-album of Prologue and Ashes are Burning), 1978
 Tales of 1001 Nights (compilation in two volumes), 1990
 Da Capo (Repertoire Germany compilation), 1995 (2 CDs) (Limited Edition in tall digipak with a much more concise, detailed booklet)
 Live at the Royal Albert Hall: King Biscuit Flower Hour, 1997 (live performance recorded 1977; two volumes)
 Songs from Renaissance Days, 1997 (compilation of out-takes, including one B-side and two Haslam solo tracks, 1979–88)
 The BBC Sessions 1975–1978, 1999 [2 CDs]
 Day of the Dreamer, 2000 (live performance recorded 1978)
 Live at the Academy of Music, Philadelphia, 2000 (live performance recorded 1985)
 Live + Direct, 2002 (edited 1970 live recording plus demos and miscellany, by Renaissance and related artists, from 1968 to 1976)
 Innocents and Illusions, 2004 (compilation double CD of Renaissance and Illusion from the original incarnation)
 Dreams & Omens, 2008 (live performance recorded 1978)
 Live in Chicago, 2010 (live performance recorded 1983)
 The Mystic and the Muse (Three-track EP of new songs), 2010
 Past Orbits of Dust, 2012 (live performances, plus one remastered studio track, from 1969 to 1970)
 DeLane Lea Studios 1973, 2015 (live performance recorded 1973)
 Academy of Music, 2015 (live performance recorded 1974)

Singles

Michael Dunford's Renaissance
These albums were essentially collaborations between Dunford and singer Stephanie Adlington.
 The Other Woman, 1994 (originally issued as by "Renaissance")
 Ocean Gypsy, 1997 (mostly new versions of past Renaissance songs)
 Trip to the Fair, 1998 (compilation of tracks from the previous two releases)

Annie Haslam's Renaissance
This album was essentially an Annie Haslam solo release (one of several).
 Blessing in Disguise, 1994.

Renaissant
This album was essentially a Terry Sullivan solo release with lyrics by Betty Thatcher-Newsinger and keyboards by John Tout. Terry's wife Christine did most of the vocals, with Terry himself taking lead on two songs.South of Winter (2005)

Major television appearances
 Don Kirshner's Rock ConcertMulti-artist television programme with Renaissance performing "Can You Understand" and "Black Flame". Syndicated (USA), 1974. 11 minutes, original running time unknown.

 The Midnight SpecialMulti-artist television programme with Renaissance performing "Carpet of the Sun" and "Midas Man". NBC (USA), 1976. 5 minutes, original running time unknown.

 Sight and Sound in ConcertFirst in a series of programmes consisting of artists performing live with the first performance broadcast simultaneously on BBC TV and FM radio, hosted by DJ Alan Black. Songs performed were: "Carpet of the Sun", "Mother Russia", "Can You Hear Me?", "Ocean Gypsy", "Running Hard", "Touching Once" and "Prologue". Originally broadcast on 8 January 1977. BBC (UK), 1977. Approximately 50–55 minutes.

 The Mike Douglas ShowTelevision talk show features Renaissance performing "Northern Lights" and "Day of the Dreamer" on 4 May 1978.

 MTV InterviewInterview by J.J. Jackson with Annie Haslam and Jon Camp on the Time Line album Tour. MTV (USA), April 1983. 10 minutes.

Illusion
Shortly prior to his death (May 1976), Keith Relf wanted to try to reform the original Renaissance. Since the name Renaissance was now firmly in the hands of the Haslam lineup, he chose the tentative band name "Now". Jim McCarty was not involved at this point. After Relf's death (May 1976), the surviving four formed a new band (along with two new musicians) and named it Illusion after Renaissance's second album. Illusion released two albums for Island Records before splitting, while a third made up of unreleased demos appeared years later. The demos were recorded in 1979 but no label was interested in them which caused Illusion to break up. The original four reformed again for the production of Through the Fire which was released under the bandname of Renaissance-Illusion. There are two second albums entitled Illusion: the second album of the original Renaissance (1971); and the eponymous second album of their reunion band, Illusion (1978).

 Out of the Mist (1977) produced by Paul Samwell-Smith (original bass player of the Yardbirds)
 Illusion (1978) produced by Douglas Bogie (recording engineer)
 Enchanted Caress: Previously Unreleased Material (1990) produced by Jim McCarty
 Illusion: The Island Years (2003) 2-CD compilation of Out of the Mist/Illusion with unreleased track by Keith Relf

Renaissance-Illusion
 Through the Fire (2001) produced by Jim McCarty

Covers of Renaissance songs
This list does not include Renaissance songs performed by individual former members of the band.
 "Ashes Are Burning" on the Faith & Disease albums Fortune His Sleep (1995) and Livesongs: Third Body (1996).
 "Ocean Gypsy" on the Blackmore's Night album Shadow of the Moon'' (1997 – a ballad version).

References

Notes

External links
 Official band website www.RenaissanceTouring.com
 Renaissance official Facebook page RenaissanceTouring
 Northern Lights (fan site) www.NlightsWeb.com
 Renaissance Fanfare (fan site) Prologue.ning.com
 Annie Haslam's official site www.AnnieHaslam.com
 Renaissance biography by Bruce Eder, discography and album reviews, credits & releases at AllMusic
 Renaissance discography, album releases & credits at Discogs
 Renaissance biography, discography, album credits & user reviews at ProgArchives.com
 Renaissance albums to be listened as stream on Spotify

English progressive rock groups
Island Records artists
Musical groups established in 1969
Musical groups disestablished in 1987
Musical groups reestablished in 1998
Musical groups disestablished in 2002
Musical groups reestablished in 2009
The Yardbirds
Sire Records artists
Elektra Records artists
Female-fronted musical groups